The 1909 Vanderbilt Commodores football team represented Vanderbilt University during the 1909 college football season. The team's head coach was Dan McGugin, who served his sixth season in that capacity. Members of the Southern Intercollegiate Athletic Association, the Commodores played eight home games in Nashville, Tennessee and finished the season with a record of 7-3 and 4-1 in SIAA.

Schedule

References

Vanderbilt
Vanderbilt Commodores football seasons
Vanderbilt Commodores football